Molino Formation may refer to:
 Molino Formation, Colombia, a Campanian to Maastrichtian geologic formation of the Cesar-Ranchería Basin in northeastern Colombia
 Molino Formation, Spain, a Devonian geologic formation in Spain
 El Molino Formation, a Maastrichtian geologic formation in Bolivia